Marcel Wenig (born 4 May 2004) is a German professional footballer who plays as a midfielder for Bundesliga club Eintracht Frankfurt.

Career

Bayern Munich

Being a product from 1. FC Nürnberg's academy, Wenig signed for Bayern Munich, aged 13. He joined the U15s team and rose through the ranks to the reserves team, FC Bayern Munich II. In the 2021–22 season he appeared three times in the Regionalliga Bayern, scoring a goal for Bayern II.

Eintracht Frankfurt

In February 2022, the midfielder signed for Eintracht Frankfurt his professional terms until 30th June 2025 and joins the Bundesliga team's first squad. Being utilised primarily in the Eintracht reserves team, Eintracht Frankfurt II in the 5th tier Hessenliga and the U19 team in the UEFA Youth League, Wenig debuted in the Bundersliga as a substitute in October 2022 against Bayer 04 Leverkusen.

International career
Wenig was capped for Germany U18 in late March 2022 for test matches. In September 2022 he was called up for Germany U19 and played three matches in the Euro qualifiers. He is also eligible for Greece through his mother.

References

External links
 

2004 births
Living people
German footballers
Association football midfielders
Eintracht Frankfurt players
Eintracht Frankfurt II players
FC Bayern Munich II players
Bundesliga players
Germany youth international footballers
Germany under-21 international footballers
People from Nuremberg
Footballers from Nuremberg
Footballers from Bavaria